Alexandra Longová (born 7 February 1994) is a Slovak competitive archer. Longová made her debut on the Slovak national team at the age of ten, and eventually competed in numerous international archery tournaments, spanning the 2015 European Games, the 2016 Summer Olympics, and European Championships. Longová currently trains under the tutelage of head coach Matej Miskovsky for the Slovak squad, while shooting at Blue Arrows archery range in her native Bratislava.

At the 2016 Summer Olympics in Rio de Janeiro, Longová etched a historic mark for Slovakia as one of the country's first archers sent to the Olympic tournament, shooting only in the women's individual recurve. Longová managed to fire off a score of 641 points, 11 targets of a perfect ten, and 8 bull's eyes, for the twenty-second spot against a field of 63 other archers in the qualifying round. Heading to the knockout stage on the third day of the Games, Longová comfortably disposed the Indian archer Laxmirani Majhi at 7–1 in the opening round, before she faced her subsequent challenge against China's Qi Yuhong, abruptly ending her Olympic debut in a harsh 0–6 defeat.

Longová was also selected to represent her country as one of the young change-makers at the 2018 Summer Youth Olympics in Buenos Aires, Argentina.

References

External links
 Alexandra Longová at the Slovenský Olympijský Výbor 
 
 

Slovak female archers
Living people
Sportspeople from Bratislava
1994 births
Archers at the 2015 European Games
European Games competitors for Slovakia
Olympic archers of Slovakia
Archers at the 2016 Summer Olympics